Texvalley is an integrated textile wholesale and retail market located in Erode, Tamil Nadu, India.

History
The mall was proposed by the Ministry of Textiles under the Comprehensive Power-loom Cluster Development Scheme. It was developed by a special purpose vehicle named Erode Textile Mall Limited. The foundation stone for the construction was laid on 22 January 2011 by the then Union Minister Dayanidhi Maran. The weekly market was opened in August 2014.

Components
Texvalley spreading over a vast area encompasses three major components:
 Big Box Bazaar - for B2B and B2C retail and wholesale market
 Global Market - spread over 1,20,000 sq ft buildup area for B2B and B2C Retail stores
 Value Mall - Spread over 80,000 sq ft land area for B2C Destination Outlet Mall with branded retails, Food & Beverages, Supermarkets, Fashion & Lifestyle, Multiplex and Food court with dine-in restaurants.

Facilities

In June 2016, the Powerloom Development and Export Promotion Council (PDEXCIL) shifted its regional office into Texvalley, and also opened a textile design studio inside the campus.

See also
Abdul Gani Textile Market
List of shopping malls in India

References

External links
Official website

Economy of  Erode
Shopping malls in Tamil Nadu
Textile industry in Tamil Nadu
2015 establishments in Tamil Nadu
Shopping malls established in 2014